Michael Maurer (born November 6, 1975) was a professional Canadian football fullback with the Edmonton Eskimos of the Canadian Football League and a professional mixed martial artist.

Maurer served in the Canadian Forces from 1993 to 1994. He played junior football with the Regina Rams from 1994 to 1996 and was signed as a territorial exemption by the Saskatchewan Roughriders in 1997, appearing in 39 games over four seasons with the Roughriders before being released in August 2000. He signed with the BC Lions and won the 88th Grey Cup in 2000 and appeared in 17 games in 2001. He was selected by the Ottawa Renegades in their 2002 expansion draft and appeared in 44 games with the Renegades over the next three seasons. He signed with the Eskimos on May 15, 2005, and made his impact primarily on special teams. In the 93rd Grey Cup against the Montreal Alouettes, which the Eskimos won by a score of 38-35 in overtime, he caught 4 passes for 41 yards substituting for fullback Mathieu Bertrand and won the Dick Suderman Trophy as the Most Valuable Canadian in the Grey Cup. He retired from football in May 2008.  Maurer came out of retirement late in the 2009 season, he played three regular season games.

Maurer debuted in Maximum Fighting Championship during the CFL off-season in 2006. His nickname is Wolverine and his style is Brazilian Jiu-Jitsu.

References

1975 births
Living people
BC Lions players
Canadian practitioners of Brazilian jiu-jitsu
Canadian football fullbacks
Canadian military personnel
Canadian male mixed martial artists
Edmonton Elks players
Ottawa Renegades players
Players of Canadian football from Saskatchewan
Saskatchewan Roughriders players
Sportspeople from Saskatoon